Hesperothamnus is a genus of flowering plants belonging to the family Fabaceae.

Its native range is Mexico.

Species:

Hesperothamnus brachycalyx 
Hesperothamnus ehrenbergii 
Hesperothamnus littoralis 
Hesperothamnus pentaphyllus 
Hesperothamnus purpusii

References

Millettieae
Fabaceae genera